Teets is a surname, an Americanized form of German Dietz. Notable people with the surname include:

Harley O. Teets (1906–1957), American prison warden
Peter B. Teets (1942-2020), American government official

See also

References